Marcel Errol Emmanuel Oakley (born 30 October 2002) is an English professional footballer who plays as a defender for Scottish Championship club Queen's Park, on loan from  club Birmingham City. He spent the first half of the 2022–23 season loan at Scottish Championship club Arbroath.

Life and career
Oakley was born in Birmingham, where he attended Ninestiles School in the Acocks Green district. He took up a two-year scholarship with Birmingham City's academy in July 2019. According to the then academy manager Kristjaan Speakman, Oakley "has the flexibility to play centre-back or right-back and is a very robust defender who excels in one v one duels in either position. His athletic qualities are improving and in possession as a right back he has the physical and technical qualities to join play in high areas of the pitch." He made his debut for Birmingham's under-23 team in February 2020, playing the whole of a 1–0 win against Derby County U23, and was a member of the team that finished as runners-up in the 2020–21 Professional Development League Northern Section, but did not play in the final against Sheffield United U23 which secured the overall title.

Oakley was one of five second-year scholars offered their first professional contract in 2021, and one of four who accepted. He played in first-team pre-season friendliesagainst Barrow, he "was an outlet down the right hand side behind Odin Bailey and mopped things up at the back, making a couple of important blocks in the process"and was given squad number 52 for the 2021–22 season.

Oakley made his senior debut on 10 August, starting at right back in Birmingham's EFL Cup first-round match at home to Colchester United of League Two. After 75 minutes, he scored the only goal of the match: he "was fed down the right hand side and he proceeded to lash the ball home into the far corner, via a nick from a defender." His first Football League appearance came on 6 November when, with five senior defenders unavailable through injury and himself only recently returned to fitness, he started at right wing-back in a 2–1 defeat at home to Reading in the Championship. According to manager Lee Bowyer, "He was excellent. First half up and down, up and down and putting tackles, he's only a little lad, but he doesn't care, he just fights." He started again on 23 November in a goalless draw away to Coventry City, but suffered a foot injury that was to keep him out until the following February.

Loan to Arbroath
On 1 September 2022, Oakley joined Scottish Championship club Arbroath on loan until January 2023. He made his debut two days later at home to Partick Thistle, coming on after 78 minutes with the score goalless but with his side having had a player sent off; Arbroath conceded twice in the last few minutes. He played 16 league matches (19 in all competitions) and "turned in some energetic wing-back displays", but although Arbroath manager Dick Campbell wanted to keep him at the club, he returned to Birmingham when his loan expired.

Loan to Queen's Park 
Oakley returned to Scottish football at the end of the January 2023 transfer window, signing for another Championship club, Queen's Park, on loan until the end of the season.

Career statistics

References

External links
 

2002 births
Living people
Footballers from Birmingham, West Midlands
English footballers
Association football defenders
Birmingham City F.C. players
Arbroath F.C. players
Queen's Park F.C. players
English Football League players
Scottish Professional Football League players
Black British sportsmen